Campe is the name of a female monster in Greek mythology.

Campe may also refer to:
 Joachim Heinrich Campe, a German writer, linguist, educator and publisher
 Lawrence Campe, a London merchant
 Campe (poem), a Bengali poem by Jibanananda Das
 Campe, a character in the Canadian Canadian animated television series Class of the Titans